Stallhofen is a municipality in the district of Voitsberg in the Austrian state of Styria.

References

Cities and towns in Voitsberg District